Digama africana is a moth of the family Erebidae first described by Charles Swinhoe in 1907. It is found in Eritrea, Kenya and Tanzania.

References

External links 
Zwier, Jaap "Sommeria africana Swinhoe 1907". Aganainae (Snouted Tigers). Retrieved April 18, 2020.

Aganainae
Moths of Africa
Moths described in 1907